was a Japanese cross-country skier. He competed in the 1932 Winter Olympics.

References

1908 births
1991 deaths
Cross-country skiers at the 1932 Winter Olympics
Japanese male cross-country skiers
Olympic cross-country skiers of Japan